Jesse James Meets Frankenstein's Daughter is a low-budget horror Western film released in 1966, in which a fictionalized version of the real-life western outlaw Jesse James encounters the fictional granddaughter (the film's title notwithstanding) of the famous Dr. Frankenstein. The film was originally released as part of a double feature along with Billy the Kid Versus Dracula in 1966. Both films were shot in eight days at Corriganville Movie Ranch and at Paramount Studios in mid-1965; both were the final feature films of director William Beaudine. The films were produced by television producer Carroll Case for Joseph E. Levine.

Plot 
Sometime in the early 1880s, Dr Frankenstein's evil granddaughter Maria has moved to the American West with her brother Rudolph, in order to use the prairie lightning storms in her experiments on immigrant children snatched from a dying town. Maria is very much in charge, killing the children and replacing their brains with artificial ones, intending to revive them as her slaves. Rudolph, however, is reluctant to help his sister, but is too afraid of her to do otherwise. After a number of failures (owing to Rudolph secretly poisoning the victims as soon as his sister revives them), they are finding it increasingly difficult to hide the trail of bodies. Down the road, Mañuel Lopez and his wife Nina decide to leave town with their daughter Juanita because of the frequent disappearances, the latest of which is that of their son.

Two gunslingers come to town, Jesse James, the infamous outlaw, who has actually survived his reported killing on April 3, 1882, and Hank Tracy, a dimwitted brute that Jesse uses as his henchman. Meeting up with Butch Curry, the head of a local gang called The Wild Bunch, they join up with the intention of stealing $100,000 from the next stagecoach. However, a member of the gang, Butch's own brother Lonny, decides to go to the sheriff and let him know about the plot in exchange for becoming his deputy and claiming the reward for James' capture. As the robbery begins, the sheriff and his men shoot the two remaining members of the Wild Bunch and seriously wound Hank.

Jesse and Hank escape and stop at the Lopez's campout to tend to Hank's wound and sleep until the morning. During the middle of the night, Juanita wakes up Jesse and Hank and leads them back to town to the Frankensteins' house to fix up Hank despite her parents forbidding her to go back there. Maria agrees to help, and even covers for her guests when the sheriff and Lonny come around looking for them, but her actual plan is to use Hank as another one of her experiments. After a failed attempt to seduce Jesse, Maria sends him to the town pharmacist with a note, then begins operating on Hank, giving him an artificial new brain and bringing him back to life. Rudolph tries to poison Hank, now called Igor, but Maria catches him this time and orders her new monster to strangle her brother.

Jesse gives the pharmacist the note from Maria, which actually reveals his identity, prompting the pharmacist to call the sheriff. The sheriff is out, but his deputy Lonny decides to take on Jesse for the reward on his head. Jesse manages to escape, killing Lonny in the process. When he returns to the Frankensteins' house, Igor incapacitates him and ties him up.

Realizing Jesse is in trouble, Juanita sends the sheriff to the house, where he finds Jesse and prepares to take him in. But Maria sends Igor to crush the sheriff. During the scuffle, Juanita frees Jesse and tries to escape. Maria orders Igor to go kill Juanita, but he strangles Maria instead and goes after Jesse. Juanita gets the sheriff's gun and kills Igor.

The next morning, as Jesse buries Hank, Juanita pleads with him to stay and live with her, but Jesse, knowing that he is a fugitive, rides off with the sheriff, who was not killed by Igor.

Cast

Reception
Jesse James Meets Frankenstein's Daughter received negative reviews from critics. On the review aggregator website Rotten Tomatoes, the film holds an approval rating of 14% based on 7 reviews and an average rating of 3/10.

Home media
The film is offered by Joe Bob Briggs with commentary on DVD.

References

External links

 
 
 
 

1966 films
1966 horror films
1960s English-language films
1960s Western (genre) horror films
1960s historical horror films
1960s monster movies
American Western (genre) horror films
American historical horror films
Biographical films about Jesse James
Embassy Pictures films
Films directed by William Beaudine
Films scored by Raoul Kraushaar
Films set in the 1880s
Films shot in California
Frankenstein films
Horror crossover films
Western (genre) crossover films
1960s American films
English-language horror films